Santa Cruz Biotechnology is a developer of biological products for medical research, and is one of the world’s largest suppliers of antibodies. The company was founded in 1991 by Dr. John Stephenson and his wife Brenda Stephenson in Santa Cruz, California. Santa Cruz Biotechnology headquarters are located in Dallas, Texas, with additional US facilities in Paso Robles, California, and Sun Valley, Idaho. The company also has international locations in Germany, Shanghai and Canada.

History
The company was originally headquartered in Santa Cruz, California, and began offering antibodies to the research community. Other products lines were added over the years – siRNAs in 2007, shRNAs in 2009, and laboratory supplies in 2010.

In 2010, the offering of biochemical was expanded from just a few hundred to over 100,000 different products.  Products related to CRISPR were introduced in 2015 for over 37,000 mouse and human genes.

Santa Cruz Biotechnology has had issues with the USDA for a number of years due to allegations of Animal Welfare Act violations. In May 2016, the company settled with the USDA, paying a $3.5 million fine for its alleged violations and agreed to the revocation of its polyclonal antibody dealer license effective from December 31, 2016.

References

Biotechnology companies established in 1991
Companies based in Dallas